Sir Francis Anthony Charles Peter Hartwell, 6th Baronet (born 1 June 1940) is a master mariner, marine surveyor, nautical consultant and, since 1993, 6th Baronet Hartwell of Dale Hall, Essex.

Early life
Hartwell is the son of Sir Brodrick William Charles Elwin Hartwell, 5th Baronet, and his first wife, Marie Josephine Hartwell. He was educated at Bedford Modern School, the Thames Nautical Training College and HMS Worcester.

Career
Hartwell started his career as a cadet in the Royal Navy Reserve as a cadet aboard the Thames Nautical Training College, HMS Worcester 1955-57.  We went to sea as an apprentice with P&O Group. He became a master mariner in 1972, assistant nautical inspector and cargo superintendent (Overseas Containers Limited) at the P&O Group (1958–71). Thereafter, he was chief officer of North Sea operations at Ocean Inchcape Limited (1972–73) before engaging in overseas port management in Nigeria, Papua New Guinea and Saudi Arabia (1975–87).

Hartwell is currently a marine consultant, a director of International Diamond Drilling in West Africa (since 1999) and also conducts survey and inspection assignments in oil, gas and shipping services in Lagos, Nigeria (since 2000).

Personal life
Hartwell married Barbara Phyllis Rae in 1968. The marriage was dissolved in 1989. They had one son, Timothy Peter Michael Charles Hartwell (born 8 July 1970), heir to the Hartwell Baronetcy.

References

1940 births
Baronets in the Baronetage of the United Kingdom
People educated at Bedford Modern School
Living people
Royal Navy officers
British Merchant Navy officers